Captain Eager and the Mark of Voth is a 2008 science-fiction/comedy film directed by Simon DaVision, starring James Vaughan, Tamsin Greig, Mark Heap and Richard Leaf. The film parodies classic B-movies through its deliberately nonsensical, superfluous storyline, poor production values, laughable dialogue and weak, inconsistent performances.

The film was shot in London over a period of four weeks, with contributions from several CGI artists. In accordance with the production's knowing satire of cheesy sci-fi, the credits for Captain Eager claim that it was filmed using "Card-o-Scope", and that CGI stands for "Cardboard and Gum Imagery".

Synopsis
Square-jawed hero Captain Eager is assigned the task of spying on Colonel Regamun, who has taken over the Veritan Sectot using a mysterious device known only as the "Mark of Voth".

Accompanied by his friends Professor Moon, Nurse Boobalicious, Scamp the Rocket Dog, Scrutty and Jenny, Eager must face down Regamun while also battling various alien monsters from his past adventures.

Reception
The film polarised critics; while some appreciated the surreal tone and knowing satire, others were left infuriated by the deliberately idiotic storyline and claimed it was a one-joke movie.

References

External links
 Captain Eager website

2008 films
2000s science fiction comedy films
2000s parody films
2008 comedy films
2008 science fiction films